XHPTEC-FM is a radio station on 99.1 FM in Santiago Juxtlahuaca, Oaxaca. It is owned by Corporación Empresarial 2 Ríos, S. de R.L. de C.V., and is known as G-Pop with a pop format.

XHPTEC shares its tower in Col. Jardín de la Soledad in Juxtlahuaca with XHVMT-FM 106.9, a community radio station, and XHPSEB-FM 104.9.

History
XHPTEC was awarded in the IFT-4 radio auction of 2017 and came to air in June 2019 alongside XHVMT and XHPSEB, which are separately owned.

References

Radio stations in Oaxaca
Radio stations established in 2019
2019 establishments in Mexico